German Lake is a lake in Isanti County, in the U.S. state of Minnesota.

A large share of the first settlers beside German Lake were natives of Germany, hence the name.

See also
List of lakes in Minnesota

References

Lakes of Minnesota
Lakes of Isanti County, Minnesota